is a Japanese web manga series written and illustrated by Katsu Aki. It was serialized on Shogakukan's eBigComic4 website from December 2018 to April 2021.

Publication
Written and illustrated by Katsu Aki, We Started a Threesome! was on Shogakukan's eBigComic4 website from December 7, 2018, to April 2, 2021. Shogakukan collected its chapters in three tankōbon volumes, released from September 30, 2019, to June 30, 2021.

In North America, Seven Seas Entertainment announced in March 2023 that they had licensed the series, and the first volume is set to be released in December of the same year.

Volume list

References

External links
 

Japanese webcomics
LGBT in anime and manga
Marriage in anime and manga
Polyamory in fiction
Romance anime and manga
Seinen manga
Slice of life anime and manga
Seven Seas Entertainment titles
Shogakukan manga
Webcomics in print